Kılıçyaka is a village in the Çay District, Afyonkarahisar Province, Turkey. Its population is 246 (2021).

History 
The name of the village is mentioned as Kizan in records from 1928.

References

Villages in Çay District